Santa Maria Madalena is a municipality located in the Brazilian state of Rio de Janeiro. Its population was 10,392 (2020) and its area is 816 km².

The municipality contains part of the  Desengano State Park, created in 1970.

References 

Municipalities in Rio de Janeiro (state)